Megacraspedus balneariellus is a moth of the family Gelechiidae. It is very locally distributed from central Europe to the Ural Mountains.

Subspecies
Megacraspedus balneariellus balneariellus
Megacraspedus balneariellus podolicus (Toll, 1942)

References

Moths described in 1907
Megacraspedus
Moths of Europe